Goler may refer to:

People
 Wendell Goler, Senior White House and Foreign Affairs correspondent for Fox News Channel
 Goler T. Butcher, professor of international law at Howard University.
 Goler clan, a clan of poor, rural families living in Nova Scotia and the subjects of the book On South Mountain: The Dark Secrets of the Goler Clan
 George W. Goler, pioneering pediatrician

Other uses
 Goler Heights, California, an unincorporated community in Kern County
 Goler Metropolitan AME Zion Church, a church in Winston-Salem, North Carolina on the National Register of Historic Places
 Goler Memorial African Methodist Episcopal Zion Church, a church in Winston-Salem, North Carolina on the National Register of Historic Places

See also
 Göhler, a surname